, also titled Forever a Woman, is a 1955 Japanese drama film and the third film directed by actress Kinuyo Tanaka. It is based on the life of tanka poetess Fumiko Nakajō (1922–1954).

Plot
Unhappily married Fumiko, mother of two children, divorces her drug-addicted husband after an incident which she regards as an act of unfaithfulness, and moves back to her mother. At the same time, she tries to find her voice as a poetess, regularly attending a poetry circle, encouraged by her married tutor Hori, whom she loves with a respectful distance. While struggling with the divorce and the fact that she could only take her daughter with her, she is diagnosed with late stage breast cancer. She undergoes a double mastectomy, which she writes about in a series of widely noticed and prize-winning poems, and tries to live her life as freely as possible and as her illness allows. She has a short affair with journalist Ōtsuki, who writes about her in a newspaper series, before she finally dies.

Cast
 Yumeji Tsukioka as Fumiko Shimojō, 
 Ryōji Hayama as Akira Ōtsuki
 Junkichi Orimoto as Shigeru Anzai
 Hiroko Kawasaki as Tatsuko
 Shirō Ōsaka as Yoshio
 Ikuko Kimuro as Seiko
 Masayuki Mori as Takashi Hori
 Yōko Sugi as Kinuko, Hori's wife
 Chōko Iida as Hide
 Bokuzen Hidari as Hide's husband
 Tōru Abe as Yamagami
 Fumie Kitahara as Kobayashi
 Kinuyo Tanaka as neighbour's wife
 Yoshiko Tsubouchi as Shirakawa

Legacy
Unanimously highly regarded for its directorial skills, film scholars differ in their evaluation of the themes addressed in The Eternal Breasts. While Alejandra Armendáriz-Hernández calls it "a daring depiction of female sexuality […] as well as a powerful instance of women’s creativity and self-expression", Alexander Jacoby sees the "feminist and progressive" theme of a woman willingly choosing career over marriage obscured by the film's concentration on her illness, thus shying away from the more controversial implications.

References

External links

Bibliography
 
 

1955 films
1955 drama films
Japanese drama films
Films about writers
Japanese black-and-white films
1950s Japanese films